Sheffield Victoria was the main railway station in Sheffield, Yorkshire, England, on the Great Central Railway, between Chesterfield and Penistone.

History

Early history
Engineered by Joseph Locke, the Sheffield, Ashton-under-Lyne and Manchester Railway linking Manchester and Sheffield opened in 1845. In 1847, the Sheffield, Ashton-under-Lyne and Manchester Railway merged with two other railway companies to form the Manchester, Sheffield and Lincolnshire Railway. The station at Bridgehouses had been outgrown, so an extension and new station were planned. John Fowler, who later gained fame for co-designing the Forth Railway Bridge in Scotland, was employed to engineer the extension and station. The extension was completed in 1847–1848 and the new Victoria station opened on 15 September 1851. 

A description of the station just before it opened appeared in the Sheffield Independent on 13 September 1851:  
The station is built of rock-faced Greenmoor stone, with chiseled beds and joints, and facings of ashlar stone from Wadsley; and distinguished as this line is for the excellence of its masonry, the front of this station is admired by those who are judges of such work, as surpassing in excellence any previous specimen. A covered verandah, with glazed roof supported by iron brackets, extends the whole length of the centre building, in order that carriages may set down passengers under cover. The entrances are very spacious and convenient, and good arrangements are made to prevent undue pressure. Tickets will be issued at three windows. At the centre, first class passengers of the Manchester, Sheffield and Lincolnshire will get their tickets. On the right hand, the second and third class passengers of the same line will receive tickets. And at the left hand window the Great Northern passengers will take their tickets. The two wings of the building are thus occupied – Eastern wing, refreshment and waiting rooms, conveniences, parcels office, and on the chamber floor the station master’s house. Western wing – telegraph office and station master’s office, rooms for lamps and ports, guards and the engineer’s office. The upper floor will contain board room and other convenient offices.

Having passed through the booking offie and reached the platform, the passenger will see before him a most ample, light and conveniently arranged station. Here is recognised at a glance one of the first fruits of The Crystal Palace. This roof is the work of Messrs. Fox, Henderson and Co. It is the ridge and furrow roof, with Paxton gutters, which is so constructed as to receive and carry away not only the wet which may fall upon the roof, but the vapour condensed to water, which may at any time be found underneath. The centre of the roof throughout its length is raised so as to permit a line of ventilation. The glass of the roof is strong crown glass about the thickness of ordinary pottery. Through the covered station run four lines of rails, while from the end of the station another line runs into a dock in the platform for the stopping and starting of the short east and west trains….The goods trains will not pass through the station at all. Two lines of rails are provided for them outside the north-eastern wall of the station and they will run past without coming at all in the way of the passenger traffic…The immense quantity of water that will be collected by the large roof will be made available for the water closets and urinals. The latter will be constructed of Minton’s white encaustic tiles, and will be open to the roof…The refreshment rooms have been taken at a handsome rent by Mr. Moyes, the spirited landlord of the Great Northern Hotel, at Lincoln…It has been constructed under the direction of John Fowler, Esq., engineer-in-chief of the company, who has been ably represented by Mr. King, the resident engineer; Messrs. Weightman, Hadfield and Goldie…being the architects. The arches upon which the station rests were built by Messrs. Miller, Blackie, and Shortridge. The approaches to the station, the platform, and the completion of the viaduct are the work of Messrs. J. and A. Ridal; and the station has been erected by Mr. Carlisle, the builder of the Beighton viaduct and the new Market Hall.

The station roof likened at the time to The Crystal Palace (in London) which spanned the main line platforms in 1867 and was further enlarged in 1874; the well-known railway contractors Logan and Hemingway were awarded the contract.

With the opening of the London Extension in 1899, Sheffield gained a new direct service to London. Slip coaches were provided for passengers for Leicester and Nottingham.

The station received a new frontage in 1908 and was further improved between 1939 and 1940. The station took on great importance when the line through the Pennines, known as the Woodhead Route after the long Woodhead Tunnel on it, was electrified for freight purposes after World War II.

Electrification

The 1950s saw the station at its zenith. Regular Manchester London Road – Sheffield Victoria – London Marylebone express services traversed the Great Central line; other expresses ran to London King's Cross over the East Coast Main Line and the named expresses the Master Cutler, the Sheffield Pullman and the South Yorkshireman served the station.  There were also many semi-fast trains running trans-Pennine from Manchester to destinations on the East Coast, with local trains to Chesterfield, Barnsley, Nottingham, Doncaster, Retford, Penistone and Lincoln.

The electrification of the line reached Sheffield Victoria by 1954, reducing the journey time to Manchester to 56 minutes. This was the only UK main line to be electrified at 1,500 V DC. From this point onwards, all passenger trains heading to Manchester required a change of locomotive at Victoria to a Class 76 or Class 77.

Closure

Although the 1950s saw services at the station reach their peak, this period also marked the beginning of its decline. In 1953, Barnsley was an early casualty as the line ran almost parallel to the former Midland Railway's Sheffield Midland – Barnsley line, serving mostly the same communities. By the end of the decade, the expresses to Marylebone were either cut or re-routed to King's Cross (in the case of the Master Cutler). In the mid-1960s, there was a concerted effort to concentrate Victoria's remaining local and express train services at Sheffield (Midland) station. From 4 October 1965, most services were diverted to Sheffield Midland, adding 2 to 4 minutes to their schedules. The only trains remaining were to Manchester, via Woodhead, the Harwich boat train and trains to Bournemouth, York and Swindon. After September 1966, Victoria was left with just an hourly Manchester service and the daily Liverpool-Harwich "Continental" boat train service.

In 1965, the second Beeching Report recommended that the Sheffield to Manchester service be consolidated; after much local wrangling, British Railways favoured the Hope Valley Line which was slower and not electrified, but served more local communities. In 1967, plans were announced to withdraw passenger services along the Woodhead route. Following public outcry, an inquiry was launched that took two years to be completed. Eventually, the inquiry backed British Rail's plans and passenger services were withdrawn from the line on 5 January 1970. The last train to Victoria station, an enthusiasts' special, arrived at 00:44 on 5 January and, from that point, the station was closed.

Between 20 and 22 January 1973, the station was briefly reopened whilst Sheffield (Midland) station was completely closed for commissioning of the new power signalling box.

The Manchester-Sheffield-Wath electric railway was entirely closed east of Hadfield in July 1981; the tracks through the Woodhead Tunnel were lifted in 1986. All of the track through the station was lifted by 1985, except for the now single track goods avoiding line which still exists to serve the steelworks at Stocksbridge,  and the station buildings were demolished in 1989 to make way for an extension to the adjacent Victoria Hotel complex. The slope that once led up to platform 1 survives as part of a pedestrian path to the car park.

Preservation

Future and potential reopening
It was suggested by Sheffield City Council that the site could be used for Sheffield's HS2 station, instead of the then planned station at Meadowhall, although an alternative route announced in 2016 would see HS2 using the existing Sheffield station, formerly known as Sheffield Midland station.

In May 2020, as part of the Restoring Your Railway fund by the Department for Transport, it was announced that the Barrow Hill Line had been awarded funding for a feasibility study. In October 2021, further funding was given to the reopening of the line to Stocksbridge which would involve the reopening of Sheffield Victoria. If reopened, the line would have at least two trains per hour with potential services extending to Chesterfield, Worksop and Rotherham.

Station Masters

William Taylor ca. 1852
Mr. Ward ca. 1857
James Brown 1864 - 1876 (afterwards station master at Doncaster)
Allen Martin Coates 1876 - 1887 (formerly station master at Barnsley)
John Alfred Hodkinson 1887 – 1893
William Mozley 1893 – 1903
T.A. Moorhouse 1903 – 1924
R.F. Ogden 1924 – 1935
Robert Bruntlett 1935 – 1939
Edwin Oliver Wright 1940 – 1941
Walter Wainwright Capon 1941 – 1944 (formerly station master at Nottingham Victoria)
W.H. Burton 1944   – 1949 (afterwards stationmaster at York)
F.C. Burton 1949 - 1951
P. Williamson 1951 - ca. 1962

In popular culture
Sheffield-based industrial music pioneers Cabaret Voltaire filmed the video to their track "Yashar" in the remains of the station in the early-1980s; at one point a Class 20 hauled freight train is seen passing through.  The band was noted for the use of decaying urban scenery in its videos.

See also
Sheffield railway station (formerly Midland Station)
Sheffield Wicker railway station

References

Notes

Sources

External links

Sheffield Victoria Station group at Flickr
Photos of Sheffield Victoria station in the 1980s
Train services from Sheffield Victoria 1942–1969
History and photos of the Woodhead route
 Station on 1947 OS Map

Victoria railway station
Former Great Central Railway stations
Woodhead Line
Transport infrastructure completed in 1848
Railway stations in Great Britain opened in 1851
Railway stations in Great Britain closed in 1970
1851 establishments in England